Mas riha is a fish curry of the Maldivian cuisine.

Mas riha is commonly eaten with steamed white rice, but when eaten for breakfast it is served with roshi flatbread and eaten along with hot tea.

Preparation
This curry is usually cooked with fresh tuna, usually kaṇḍumas (skipjack tuna), but also kanneli (yellowfin tuna) or laṭṭi (little tunny). The fish is diced and cooked together over low fire with a mixture of fried onions and spices to which water is added. The curry is left to simmer for a while and coconut milk is added towards the end of the cooking process.

See also
 List of tuna dishes

References

External links
Mas huni and Masriha - Himal: Farms, Feasts, Famines; Disappearing foods
Eating on the Islands - As times have changed, so has the Maldives' unique cuisine and culture

Maldivian curries
Tuna dishes
Foods containing coconut